50/50, also known as Fifty Fifty is a 1982 Norwegian drama film directed by Oddvar Bull Tuhus, starring Steinar Raaen and Rune Dybedahl. A group of kids who have just graduated from school find working life tiresome. They decide to get their old band back together, and go on a tour.

External links
 
 Fifty Fifty 50/50 at Filmweb.no

1982 films
1982 drama films
Films directed by Oddvar Bull Tuhus
Norwegian drama films